The introduction of fast torpedo boats in the late 19th century was a serious concern to navies of an era that saw a number of innovations in naval warfare, including the first torpedo boats, which carried spar torpedoes, steam propulsion and steel ships.

Clements Robert Markham, later president of the Royal Geographical Society, an English eyewitness of the War of the Pacific stated:
The value of fast torpedo boats in maintaining a blockade cannot be over-estimated. They are not only the "eyes" but the "legs" of a squadron. Not only are they of use in preventing the escape of any of the enemy's ships, but they also afford protection to their own fleet, giving timely notice of approaching danger at night by a prearranged system of flashing lights, and in the daytime by their great speed. The thoroughness of the blockade of Callao was undoubtedly due, in a great measure, to the Chilean torpedo boats.

Chilean torpedo boats
With the exception of Vedette, all boat names are of Mapudungun provenance.

Torpedo boat Vedette 
Vedette was built in Yarrow of Poplar (Yard nr. 495) and arrived to Valparaíso on 17 October 1879 on board of Belle of Cork. She was assembled in Valparaíso and in 1893 she was still listed by the navy. The name seems to be the name of the boat class rather than the proper name of a boat.
 Displacement: 10 t
 Power: 
 Ship armament: 2 × Spar torpedo
 Length: 
 Speed: 16.5 kn

Torpedo boats built 1880

Yet 1880 were delivered to Chile two torpedo boats bought from Yarrow of Poplar shipyard.,  (Yard nr. 476) and Tucapel (Yard nr. 475):
 Displacement: 5 t / 30 t
 Length: 14.63 m
 Beam: 2.44 m
 Power: 60 HP
 Speed: 12.5 kn
 Ship armament: 2 × Spar torpedo + 2 x Hotchkiss machine gun
They could be stowed in the major ships of the navy and Colo Colo was brought by railway to Puno and then to the Titicaca Lake (elevation of ) in order to impede guerrilla activities in the zone.

Torpedo boats built 1880–82
During the War of the Pacific the Chilean Navy bought ten torpedo boats from the Yarrow of Poplar shipyard.
 Displacement: 25–30 tons
 Power: 400 HP
 Ship armament: 2 × Spar torpedo + 1 x Hotchkiss machine gun
 Length: 26–30 m
 Speed:

Peruvian torpedo boats 

1879 the Peruvian Government bought three torpedo boats: Alay, Alianza and República from the Herreshoff Manufacturing Company, Bristol, Rhode Island, United States, although R. V. Simpson states that the third boat was never delivered to Perú.

República and Alianza arrived in Perú in August and September 1879. Both boats were scuttled Alianza aftermath the Battle of Arica in June 1880 and República in January 1881 in the Blockade of Callao, to prevent their capture by the Chilean forces.

Alay was secretly transported by ship to Colon, Panama in the Caribbean Sea. From Colon she was transported by rail to Panama City, on the Pacific Ocean. On 2 December Alay sailed, bound for Perú but on 24 December 1879, the Chilean gunned transport Amazonas captured the boat in the Ecuadorian port Ballenita. In Chile she was renamed Guacolda and commissioned into the Chilean navy and fought in the Blockade of Callao between April of 1880 and January of 1881. It sank on April 4, 1881 while being towed off Chincha Islands

 Displacement: 6 t
 Power: 1 máquina a vapor alternativa de dos cilindros
 Ship armament: 2 Spar torpedo + 1 x Hotchkiss 37 mm machine gun
 Length: 
 Speed:

See also
 List of decommissioned ships of the Chilean Navy

References

Sources
 
 
 
 

Torpedo boats of the Chilean Navy
Ships of the War of the Pacific